Anthony Valentine (17 August 1939 – 2 December 2015) was an English actor best known for his television roles: the ruthless Toby Meres in Callan (1967–72), the sadistic Major Horst Mohn in Colditz (1972–74), Bob in Tales of the Unexpected, the suave titular gentleman thief in Raffles (1977), and the murderous Baron Gruner in the Sherlock Holmes episode "The Illustrious Client" (1991).

Early life and education
Valentine was born in Blackburn, Lancashire; he moved with his family to Chiswick, West London when he was 6 years old, going on to attend Acton County Grammar School.

Career
Aged 9, Valentine was spotted tap-dancing in a stage version of Robin Hood at Ealing Town Hall. He made his professional acting debut at the age of 10 in the Nettlefold Studios film No Way Back (1949), and at the age of 12 he played a boy sleuth in The Girl on the Pier (1953). He worked regularly as a child actor for the BBC, most notably as Harry Wharton in the 1950s adaptation of Billy Bunter of Greyfriars School, having initially played Lord Mauleverer in earlier episodes.

In 1958 he appeared in a television production of Ibsen's John Gabriel Borkman, with Laurence Olivier as Borkman and Irene Worth as his wife, as part of ITV's series The Play of the Week.

Valentine's early stage credits include the premiere of Arnold Wesker's Chicken Soup with Barley (Royal Court Theatre, 1958); John Osborne's Epitaph for George Dillon (Royal Court Theatre, 1958); the Australian drama The Shifting Heart (Duke of York's Theatre, 1959, with Leo McKern); John Mortimer's Two Stars for Comfort (Garrick Theatre, 1962, with Trevor Howard); the original production of Half a Sixpence (Cambridge Theatre, 1963, with Tommy Steele); and The Platinum Cat (Wyndham's Theatre, London, 1965, with Kenneth Williams).

Valentine continued to work on stage, but he became best known for his striking performances on television: as the ruthless Toby Meres in the series Callan (1967–72), the Luftwaffe officer Major Horst Mohn in the BBC drama Colditz (1974), the eponym in Yorkshire TV's Raffles (1975-1977), and the suave crook George Webster in The Knock (1994–96).

Valentine's later stage credits include No Sex Please, We're British (Strand Theatre, 1971); Anthony Shaffer's Sleuth (St Martin's Theatre, 1972, with Marius Goring); a revival of Hans Christian Andersen (London Palladium, 1977, again with Tommy Steele); 'Art' (Wyndham's Theatre, 1999–2000); and, as Cardinal Monticelso, in Webster's The White Devil (Lyric Theatre, 2000).

Valentine made his debut as a writer and director in 1998 at The Mill at Sonning with The Waiting Game. He went on to direct regularly at the Mill, including productions of Separate Tables (2005), The Odd Couple (2009) and California Suite (2012). On 12 November 2005 Valentine became a patron of the Thwaites Empire Theatre in his birthplace, Blackburn.

He narrated three Wildlife Explorer documentary films: Powerful Predators, Animal Defences, and Weird and Wonderful. He was also the voice of Dr. X on the American heavy metal band Queensrÿche's 1988 album Operation: Mindcrime. He narrated a 1980 NOVA documentary entitled It's About Time, presented by Dudley Moore and featuring Isaac Asimov. He also voiced a television commercial for Gordon's gin.

Death
Valentine died on 2 December 2015 in Guildford, Surrey. He had suffered from Parkinson's disease since 2012. He was survived by his wife, actress Susan Skipper. The couple married in 1982, having met during the filming of the successful Raffles television series, and later appeared together again in a television film of Ivor Novello's show The Dancing Years (1979).

Interviewed in 1995, Valentine recalled two earlier brushes with death. First, when he was dangerously ill with meningitis at the age of 26; second in 1974, when caught up in the Turkish invasion of Cyprus, he holed up for two days in a holiday hotel as gunfire raged outside. "I've always felt that everything since has been an incredible bonus," he said.

Filmography

Film

Television

References

External links
 
 Anthony Valentine profile, Aveleyman.com; accessed 1 January 2016.

1939 births
2015 deaths
English male child actors
English male film actors
English male stage actors
English male television actors
People educated at Acton County Grammar School
People from Blackburn
Deaths from Parkinson's disease
Neurological disease deaths in England